Kent Plantation House is the oldest standing structure in Central Louisiana. Listed since 1971 in the National Register of Historic Places, Kent House is located in Alexandria in Rapides Parish. The plantation house is a representation of southern plantation life between 1795 and 1855. The main structure was erected in 1800 with the labor of people enslaved by Pierre Baillio. The bousillage Creole house and restored period outbuildings are now a showcase for tourists.

History
Kent Plantation House displays original artifacts from people who worked and lived at the house during its operation.

Buildings
H. Parrott Bacot, former director of the Anglo-American Art Museum at Louisiana State University  in Baton Rouge, Louisiana, led the interior restoration.

The several outbuildings surrounding the main structure are furnished with Federal, Sheraton, and Empire pieces.

The Milk House was built between 1820 and 1830; dairy products, such as cheese, milk, and butter, were prepared and stored there. The Slave Cabin shows the primitive conditions in which the slaves at the plantation lived. The Blacksmith Shop was constructed about 1815. The Kitchen contains an open hearth fireplace for cooking.

Marker Text
The marker at the front entrance of the Kent Plantation House reads:
Kent House, the oldest known standing structure in Rapides Parish, was built by Pierre Baillio, completed in 1800. Baillio constructed the house on land received through a Spanish land grant circa 1794.
The house was actually built by enslaved people, not Ballio himself.

See also

Peggy Bolton

Gallery

References

External links
Kent Plantation House - official site

Houses completed in 1800
Creole architecture in Louisiana
Houses on the National Register of Historic Places in Louisiana
Plantation houses in Louisiana
Houses in Alexandria, Louisiana
Museums in Rapides Parish, Louisiana
Historic house museums in Louisiana
Tourist attractions in Alexandria, Louisiana
National Society of the Colonial Dames of America
National Register of Historic Places in Rapides Parish, Louisiana
Slave cabins and quarters in the United States
Blacksmith shops